Guglielmo Inglese (24 November 1892 –  14 January 1972) was an Italian actor, radio personality and playwright.

Life and career 
Born in Naples into a family of Apulian origins, Inglese debuted on stage as a child actor at 2 years old, and then he was part of some of the most important stage companies of the time, including the one led by Raffaele Viviani in 1920. He abandoned the theater to devote himself to radio, with which he got a large popularity thanks to his comic monologues caricaturing  typical Southern stock characters, notably the "peasant from Apulia". He made his cinema debut when he already was mature aged, in 1948, and was mostly cast in character roles in which he reprised his radio repertoire. He was often a sidekick of Totò, both in cinema and on stage. He was also author of several riviste.

Selected filmography 

 Totò Tarzan (1950) - Capostazione barese
 Arrivano i nostri (1951) - Brig. Vitali
 Accidents to the Taxes!! (1951) - Il capitano del Panfilo
 Toto the Third Man (1951) - Renato - il cancelliere
 Auguri e figli maschi! (1951) - Vincenzo Frunzo
 The Steamship Owner (1951) - Lo scenografo
 Era lui... sì! sì! (1951) - Vannozzi
 My Heart Sings (1951) - Brigadiere Bichetti
 Free Escape (1951)
 Viva il cinema! (1952)
 Sardinian Vendetta (1952) - Cavalier Rossetti
 Abracadabra (1952) - Nicola Caiazzo
 Torment of the Past (1952) - Giacomo
 Toto in Color (1952) - Il giardiniere
 Il romanzo della mia vita (1952) - Pasquale Curcio
 Poppy (1952) - Bidello Elia
 Non è vero... ma ci credo (1952) - The Man with a Hunchback
 I morti non pagano tasse (1952)
 Beauties on Motor Scooters (1952) - Pelacardi
 Saluti e baci (1953) - L'usciere Pellegrino (uncredited)
 Fermi tutti... arrivo io! (1953) - Proprietario 'Hotel Santiago'
 Neapolitan Turk (1953) - Carpenter of the prison (uncredited)
 Easy Years (1953) - Capo divisione
 It Happened in the Park (1953) - Il zio di Beniamino (segment: Il paraninfo)
 Naples Sings (1953) - Cavalier Fiammante
 Finalmente libero! (1953) - Judge
 Delírio (1954)
 Vacanze a Villa Igea (1954)
 Madonna delle rose (1954)
 Due soldi di felicità (1954) - don Girolamo
 Toto in Hell (1955) - Il cavalier Scartaccio
 Carovana di canzoni (1955) - Hotel manager
 Cantate con noi (1955) - Nicola
 Giuramento d'amore (1955)
 Scapricciatiello (1955) - The Customer at the barber's
 The Bigamist (1956) - Don Vincenzino
 Presentimento (1956) - Il contadino con il somaro
 Cantando sotto le stelle (1956) - Guglielmo Traversa
 Arriva la zia d'America (1956) - Guglielmo Camaramo
 Dreams in a Drawer (1957) - The Neurology Professor
 Marisa (1957) - Emilio
 Vacanze a Ischia (1957) - Cancelliere
 La zia d'America va a sciare (1957)
 Ladro lui, ladra lei (1958) - Cavalier Lauricella
 Seksdagesløbet (1958) - Peppo
 Three Strangers in Rome (1958) - Michele, Magda's wooer
 Serenatella sciuè sciuè (1958)
 Gli avventurieri dell'Uranio (1958) - Venanzio
 Arriva la banda (1959)
 Lui, lei e il nonno (1959)
 Le confident de ces dames (1959)
 Spavaldi e innamorati (1959)
 Avventura in città (1959)

References

External links 
 

1892 births
1962 deaths
Italian male film actors
Italian male television actors
Italian male stage actors
19th-century Neapolitan people
20th-century Italian male actors
Italian dramatists and playwrights
20th-century Italian male writers
20th-century Italian dramatists and playwrights
Italian comedians
20th-century Italian comedians